Migjorn is a Comarca (county) in the island of Majorca, Balearic Islands, Spain.

It includes the following municipalities:

 Campos
 Felanitx
 Llucmajor
 Ses Salines
 Santanyi

Comarcas of the Balearic Islands